The Jasmine Flower is the seventh studio album by Heather Nova, released in 2008.

Track listing
All songs written and performed by Heather Nova.

"Ride" – 3:26
"Beautiful Storm" – 3:24
"Maybe Tomorrow" – 3:57
"Out On A Limb" – 3:53
"Every Soldier Is A Mother's Son" – 3:12
"Out In New Mexico" – 3:28
"Looking For The Light" – 2:39
"Hollow" – 3:11
"If I Should Die" – 3:16
"Say Something" – 3:47
"Follow Me In Grace" – 3:35
"Always Christmas" – 4:29

Charts

References

2008 albums
Heather Nova albums